Alanna Clarke is a Canadian singer/songwriter, guitarist, and piano player based in Cochrane, Alberta.

Early life
Clarke grew up near Cochrane, and attended Cochrane High School.

Career
Clarke won the Calgary Breakfast Television Spotlight. She was winner of the Toast 'n Jam Battle of the Bands 2007 held at Canada Olympic Park. Her first demo CD, titled Kissing Booth, was released in 2006. She won the Don Weldon Award for most promising performer at the Calgary Stampede Talent Search in 2008. In the Cochrane Youth Talent Festival she won two years in row.   Her third CD, Wild Rose, was released in 2010, and one of her songs was selected for use in the movie, Degrassi Takes Manhattan.

On August 11, 2011 Clarke performed in Toronto's annual all-female, multi-genre artist Honey Jam showcase presented by PhemPhat in Toronto, Ontario, Canada.

On November 12, 2014 Alanna premiered a new single Heartstrings (Produced by Mike 'WUFF' Wofford, Vocal Produced by Jon E.K. and Mixed by Adrian Bradford) on the Los Angeles blog Free Bike Valet.

References

External links

Official site of Alanna Clarke (archive)
Alanna Clarke - Canada Live (CBC)

Year of birth missing (living people)
Living people
Canadian women singers
Canadian women guitarists
Musicians from Alberta
People from Cochrane, Alberta